Woodmere Cemetery is at West Fort Street and Woodmere Avenue in Detroit, Michigan, in the neighborhood of Springwells Village in what was originally the township of Springwells. Woodmere Cemetery is operated by the Midwest Memorial Group.

History 
The Woodmere Cemetery Association was organized on July 8, 1867, by a group of prominent Detroit businessmen who purchased approximately 250 acres to establish a rural cemetery for the city of Detroit. Woodmere's layout was designed by Adolph Strauch, who also designed Spring Grove Cemetery in Cincinnati, Ohio. Construction began in 1868 and the cemetery was dedicated on July 14, 1869.

The first burials occurred prior to the cemetery's official opening. The first burial was for Anna Maria Schwartz, who was buried in Section C in November 1868. She was soon joined by approximately 2,000 removals from Detroit's City Cemetery that were reburied at Woodmere. In addition to these burials, the city of Detroit also contracted for approximately five acres for the burial of the city's poor. Section C is the cemetery's oldest section and where the large Elks' Rest monument can be found. Once Section C was filled, Woodmere ended its contract with the city to bury the city's poor.

Notable sections 
The U.S. Army section is at the cemetery's southern end, next to Dearborn Street. The army purchased this section which contains veterans from the Civil War as well as World War II. In 1896 the Civil War soldiers buried at Fort Wayne were moved to Woodmere as the cemetery there had fallen to decay and the records were in shambles. The flagpole in this section divides the Grand Army of the Republic section to the east from the U.S. Army section to the west.

Temple Beth El purchased two sections at Woodmere, Section Beth El and part of the adjacent Section NF. Many of the mausoleums in Section NF were vandalized in December 2012. The bronze doors were removed, leaving the mausoleums open to the elements. These doors were presumably sold for scrap.

The American Moslem Society purchased a section at the northwest corner of the cemetery within view of its mosque on Vernor Highway. This mosque was established in 1937 and is Michigan's oldest.

Victims of the Ford Hunger March killed on March 7, 1932, are buried in the Ferndale section at the cemetery's north end abutting Vernor Highway. The victims are Joseph York, Joseph Bussell, Kalman Leny, and Joseph DeBascio. The United Auto Workers also placed a headstone on an empty space in the same row as the others for Curtis Williams, a marcher who died several months later due to unrelated causes. Williams was cremated at Woodmere, but his ashes were not interred there. A marker is located along the fence outside of the cemetery near these graves.

Notable burials 
 John J. Bagley (1832–1881), Michigan Governor (1873–1877)
 Charlie Bennett (1854–1927), Major League Baseball player
 David D. Buick (1854–1929), founder Buick Motor Company
 Hamilton Carhartt (1857–1937), founder of Carhartt Inc. Clothing
 Dexter M. Ferry (1833–1907), founder of D.M. Ferry & Co.
 Henry M. Leland (1843–1932), founder of Cadillac and Lincoln luxury car brands
 Frederick Matthaei (1892–1973), founder of Matthaei Botanical Gardens
 Philetus Norris (1821–1885), founder of Norris, Michigan (now Hamtramck) and 2nd Superintendent of Yellowstone National Park
 Charles A. Roxborough (1888–1963), first African-American man elected to the Michigan Senate
 James E. Scripps (1835–1906), founder of The Detroit News
 Private Eddie Slovik (1920–1945), only WW II U.S. soldier executed for desertion
 David Vartanian (1890–1966), RMS Titanic survivor
 James Vernor (1843–1927), inventor of Vernor's Ginger Ale
 David Whitney (1830–1900), lumber baron
 Ahmad Bakhsh Sindhi (1917–2000), Former Law and Justice Minister in Rajasthan, India
 Three British Commonwealth war graves, of two Canadian Army soldiers of World War I and a Royal Canadian Air Force airman of World War II.
 Grace Whitney-Hoff (1862-1938), American philanthropist, founder of the Foyer International des Etudiantes in Paris.

References

External links
 
 

Buildings and structures in Detroit
Cemeteries in Michigan
Rural cemeteries